Irene Michelle Ekelund (born 8 March 1997) is a Swedish track and field sprint athlete who competes internationally for Sweden. On 14 July 2013 Ekelund won the gold medal at the World Youth Championships in Donetsk when she finished first in the 200 metres final. It was also the first gold medal for Sweden in a sprint event in a global championship ever.

Biography
Ekelund was born in Pakistan to a Swedish father and an Angolan mother during her father's United Nations-service in Pakistan. The family later moved back to Sweden and settled in Karlstad where she today lives with her mother and five siblings. She currently studies at the stylist program at her high school (gymnasium) in her hometown, and competes for a club in the southern Swedish city of Malmö, Malmö Allmänna Idrottsförening (MAI). Ekelund has several times stated that she is not very interested in athletics, and that she does not have any real idols in the sport.

Ekelund currently holds the Swedish indoor record in 200 metres. At the Swedish National Indoor Championships in Norrköping 2013, Ekelund won gold medals in the distances 60 metres and 200 metres. Her international debut took place in the indoor-international between Sweden, Finland and Norway in Växjö, Sweden at January 20, 2013. Later in 2013 she also made her international championship-debut when she competed in the World Youth Championships in Donetsk, Ukraine. She won the gold medal in 200 metres and finished fifth in the 100 metres final. She became the first Swedish athlete to win an international championship in a sprint event. Thanks to her performance, she was awarded "Newcomer of the Year" at the Swedish Sports Award.

Achievements

Personal bests

References

External links 
World Athletics profile for Irene Ekelund
EAA profile for Irene Ekelund

Swedish female sprinters
1997 births
Living people
Swedish expatriates in Pakistan
Swedish people of Angolan descent
Swedish sportspeople of African descent
Swedish Athletics Championships winners